The National Live Music Awards of 2017 are the second National Live Music Awards. The event took place on 7 December 2017, and the gala event moved from Sydney to Melbourne.

All categories, bar the two People's Choice Awards, are voted on by a panel of judges around the country, representing every State and Territory in Australia. The nominees of the two People's Choice Awards were chosen by the judges, however the public vote for the winner.

There are two new awards this year: Best Pop Act and Best Country or Folk Act. The All Ages Achievement Award, which recognises an individual or organisation who supports and fosters all ages events, has expanded from NSW to Victoria.

The Heatseeker Award is now The Best New Act. The Hard Rock or Metal genre category has been shortened to just Hard Rock, the previous Roots award is now the Blues & Roots award, with Country and Folk nominees given their own category for the first time.

National awards
Nominations and wins below.

Live Act of the Year

Live Voice of the Year

Best New Act

Live Bassist of the Year

Live Drummer of the Year

Live Guitarist of the Year

Live Instrumentalist of the Year

Live Blues and Roots Act of the Year

Live Country or Folk Act of the Year

Live Electronic Act (or DJ) of the Year

Live Hard Rock Act of the Year

Live Hip Hop Act of the Year

Live Pop Act of the Year

Live R&B or Soul Act of the Year

Best Live Music Festival or Event

International Live Achievement (Group)

International Live Achievement (Solo)

Industry Achievement

Winner unknown

People's Choice awards
Best Live Act of the Year

Best Live Voice of the Year

State and Territory awards
Note: Wins only.

References

2017 in Australian music
2017 music awards
National Live Music Awards